Acipcoville is a neighborhood in Birmingham in Jefferson County, Alabama, United States.

History
Acipcoville was named for the American Cast Iron Pipe Company, which built a community around it. In 1905, southern investors organized and wholly financed ACIPCO in Atlanta. They selected Birmingham as the site for a new pipe plant and in 1906 constructed a pipe foundry, powerhouse and machine shop and "Quarters for about 40 black families. Guided by John J. Eagan, principal stockholder and first president, the company succeeded from the start. Under Eagan's leadership, it also inaugurated a now-celebrated program of corporate welfare benefits. The first of these benefits was a bathhouse constructed in 1912 at the plant site.

From its inception in 1905, the company established a tradition for innovative pipemaking practices. During World War I, ACIPCO experimented with the direct delivery of molten pig iron from the blast furnaces of Republic Steel Corporation's Thomas plant to its pipemaking foundry. In the early 1920s when the Birmingham District led the industry in the adoption of centrifugal casting techniques, ACIPCO developed the Moore method of centrifugal casting in sand-lined molds. Company President John H. Eagan's Plan of Business Administration, which became permanent company policy in 1924, featured employee profit sharing. Eagan's profit sharing idea became a model widely emulated in American industry.

In 1921, Eagan brought workers into corporate management and, in 1922, created a profit-sharing arrangement. At his death, he created a permanent trust of all the company's common stock. ACIPCO's operation has continued as a beneficial trust ever since.

Demographics
According to the census returns from 1850-2010 for Alabama, it has never reported a population figure separately on the U.S. Census. It is a part of the city of Birmingham, Alabama today.

Gallery

References

Former municipalities in Alabama
Neighborhoods in Birmingham, Alabama
Company towns in Alabama